The Knap of Howar on the island of Papa Westray in Orkney, Scotland is a Neolithic farmstead which may be the oldest preserved stone house in northern Europe.  Radiocarbon dating shows that it was occupied from 3700 BC to 2800 BC, earlier than the similar houses in the settlement at Skara Brae on the Orkney Mainland.

The site
The farmstead consists of two adjacent rounded rectangular thick-walled stone buildings with very low doorways facing the sea. The larger and older structure is linked by a low passageway to the other building, which has been interpreted as a workshop or a second house. They were constructed on an earlier midden, and were surrounded by midden material which has protected them. There are no windows; the structures were presumably lit by fire, with a hole in the roof to let out smoke. Though they now stand close to the shore, they would have originally lain inland. 

The stone walls of the buildings are preserved and while the roof is missing, it was likely made of wood and thatched or turfed. A hearth and a stone-built cupboard survive inside, and there may have been an external porch. Local stone splits into thin slabs, offering a ready source of construction material.

Fireplaces, partition screens, beds and storage shelves are almost intact, and post holes were found indicating the roof structure.

Evidence from the middens shows that the inhabitants were keeping cattle, sheep and pigs, cultivating barley and wheat and gathering shellfish as well as fishing for species which must have been line caught using boats.

Finds of finely-made and decorated Unstan ware pottery link the inhabitants to chambered cairn tombs nearby and to sites far afield including Balbridie and Eilean Domhnuill.
The name Howar is believed to be derived from Old Norse word  haugr  meaning  mounds or barrows.  The site is in the care of Historic Scotland.

See also
 
 Oldest buildings in Scotland
 List of the oldest buildings in the world

Notes

References
 Wickham-Jones, Caroline (2007) Orkney: A Historical Guide. Edinburgh. Birlinn.

Other sources
 Scotland Before History - Stuart Piggott, (Edinburgh University Press. 1982) 
 Scotland's Hidden History - Ian Armit, Tempus (in association with Historic Scotland. 1998) 
 The Other Orkney Book - Gordon Thomson, (Northabout Publishing. 1980) 
 "The Knap of Howar and the Origins of Geometry" - by Nicholas Cope & Keith Critchlow (Kairos publications 2016).  - www.ncope.co.uk

External links

Orkneyjar - The Knap o' Howar 
Knap of Howar, Papa Westray.

4th-millennium BC architecture in Scotland
Archaeological sites in Orkney
Prehistoric Orkney
Scheduled monuments in Scotland
Stone Age sites in Scotland
Neolithic settlements
Former populated places in Scotland
Neolithic Scotland
Historic Scotland properties in Orkney
Houses in Orkney
Papa Westray